Hongey Judaa Na Hum (English: We won't be separated) is an Indian television drama series that premiered on Sony Entertainment Television India on 10 September 2012. The story depicts the tempestuous love story of a young married couple, rediscovering love after meeting with a car crash, erasing their memory. The show stars Raqesh Vashisth and Aamna Sharif in the lead roles and marks the return of Aamna Sharif to television after five years. Hongey Judaa Na Hum ended on 20 March 2013 due to low TRP's.

Plot
Rohan (Raqesh Vashisth) and Muskaan (Aamna Sharif) are a young couple who have been married for five years. They love each other deeply but continuously bicker and fight. However, Muskaan's mother, Tara (Deepshikha), does not like Muskaan's marriage with Rohan as they fight a lot, while Rohan's family loves Muskaan a lot. One day, the two of them meet with a tragic car accident and lose their memory of their past with each other. Dr. Anirudh (Aamir Ali) a good friend and doctor of Muskaan, asks them to stay separate for their own well being. Thus, they start life afresh with their families, separated from each other. A year passes, and life gives Rohan and Muskaan another chance. Rohan has a good friend, Anushka (Pavitra Punia) who is his paying guest, but Rohan ultimately falls for Muskaan, unknowing his past. While Anushka falls for Rohan, circumstances lead Muskaan to marry Anirudh, as Tara wanted, because she was aware of Anirudh's love for Muskaan, but as fate would have it, Rohan gets back his memory and tries to get Muskaan back. Anushka, who is in love with Rohan, tries to do everything she can to separate Rohan and Muskaan, and tries to kill Muskaan. There is a party going on in Duggal's house and Anushka takes advantage of it by sneaking into Tara Duggal's room and takes her gun. She tries to shoot Muskaan. She is afraid of getting caught, so Anushka goes to the hospital and kills Tara. At Tara's funeral, Anirudh reveals the truth about Muskaan being Rohan's wife and they finally get married. Anirudh meets them one final time before leaving for London. Muskaan starts a new life with Rohan. There is a new entry of a lady named Rama (Kishwer Merchant) who is Rohan's paternal cousin Badri's (Manmohan Tiwari) wife. She plans to create tension in the house. The show ends with Muskaan getting kidnapped and while trying to save Muskaan, Rohan and Muskaan die. Rama and Lallan are arrested for their murder. The show ends with Muskaan and Rohan dying together and living in heaven together.

Cast

References

External links
 Official website at SET India
  Website at SET Asia
  Honge Judaa Naa Hum faces problems by Times of India

Sony Entertainment Television original programming
Indian drama television series
Indian television soap operas
2012 Indian television series debuts
2013 Indian television series endings